Kingdom Come is a studio album from the American contemporary worship band Elevation Worship. The album was released on September 7, 2010 through its own imprint label, Elevation Worship.

Singles 
On August 3, 2010, the song "Kingdom Come" was released as the lead single for the album.

Critical reception 

Shannon Lewis, reviewing the album for Saint Lewis Music, stated that the album "fits firmly into Hillsong United / Planetshakers / Generation Unleashed / ALM: UK territory, and doesn't pull any surprises there." and that "I hear a great deal of musical talent - the potential is enormous - and there are hints of what they are capable of as songwriters." In a review by Daniel Lozano for CityLights Church, he stated that "Overall this is a pretty good album." and that "This album would probably be best for use during your devotional time or when you need some music to play while you are praying."

Track listing

Chart performance

EP 

The Kingdom Come Remix EP consists of remixed renditions of select songs from Elevation's preceding release, Kingdom Come. The EP, consisting of five songs from the album that were remixed, was released on October 26, 2010 through its own imprint label as a free digital download. The remixes were done by Aaron Robertson, Joel Khouri and Brandon Willet (using the name Bwillackers). The EP was then shared on the video-sharing website, Vimeo, in March 2011.

References

2010 live albums
Elevation Worship albums